Liu Qi (born 27 February 1996) is a Chinese ski jumper.

World Cup

Standings

Individual starts (15)

External links 

1996 births
Living people
Chinese female ski jumpers
Sportspeople from Jilin City
Skiers from Jilin